Nino Jakirović (born 4 April 1995) is a Bosnian-Herzegovinian professional footballer who last played as a defender for Bosnian club Igman Konjic.

References

1995 births
Living people
Sportspeople from Mostar
Association football defenders
Bosnia and Herzegovina footballers
FK Velež Mostar players
FK Igman Konjic players
Premier League of Bosnia and Herzegovina players